Lost Treasure is a 2003 action film starring Stephen Baldwin, Nicollette Sheridan and Coby Ryan McLaughlin. It was written by Harris Done and Diane Fine and directed by Jim Wynorski under the pseudonym Jay Andrews. This movie is about a treasure hunt on a tropical island. The plot involves a treasure supposedly hidden by Columbus. The map that leads to it was split into two halves, so that one would need both pieces to find it.

Plot 

A painting is stolen from a building during a great fire and after it is recovered, the police find inside a mysterious map. A police officer responsible for the case asks his brother (Stephen Baldwin), who is an antiques expert, to help him during the investigation. Analysing the paint and fabric, they find that the map belonged to Christopher Columbus and the drawings in it refer to an old legend of a lost treasure. Besides unraveling the mysterious riddles, the police officer and his brother will have to fight off a violent gang pursuing the treasure as well.

Cast
Stephen Baldwin as Bryan McBride
Nicollette Sheridan as Carrie
Coby Ryan McLaughlin as Det. Carl McBride
Hannes Jaenicke as Ricaro Arterra
Jerry Doyle as Det. Sean Walker
Mark Christopher Lawrence as Danny G.
Tami-Adrian George as Tammy
Scott L. Schwartz as Crazy Joe

External links

 

2003 films
2003 action films
American action films
CineTel Films films
Treasure hunt films
Films directed by Jim Wynorski
2000s English-language films
2000s American films